, also known as Winning Strip, is the second studio album by Japanese singer and songwriter Ringo Sheena, released on March 31, 2000, by Toshiba EMI. The limited edition version includes a special booklet and case. The album debuted at #1 and has sold over 2,332,000 copies. It was certified two million copies by the RIAJ. In September 2007, Rolling Stone Japan rated the album at number 89 on its list of the "100 Greatest Japanese Rock Albums of All Time".

Background 
Sheena began to record Shōso Strip from the summer of 1999.
Since she thought that the track list was almost the same as Muzai Moratorium, she started with a clean slate.
There were several songs which were not recorded because of her busy schedule, but had been completed in her head.
She decided to record new songs and replaced some of those old songs for the album with them.
The recording was finished during that same summer.

In 2012, the song "Tsuki ni Makeinu" was covered by Nanou on his album Unsung.

Awards 
 Japan Gold Disc Award  "Rock Album of the Year" 
 Japan Record Award "Best Album prize"

Track listing

Personnel 

"Kyogen-shō"
 Ringo Sheena – vocals
 Yukio Nagoshi – electric guitars, acoustic guitars
 Seiji Kameda – bass guitars
 Noriyasu Kawamura – drums
 Koichi Asakura, Asa-Chang (from Asa-Chang & Junray, ex-Tokyo Ska Paradise Orchestra) – drums, percussion
 Nobuhiko Nakayama – programming
 Toshiyuki Mori – electric piano
 Chieko Kinbara Strings – string section

"Yokushitsu"
 Ringo Sheena – vocals, piano
 Susumu Nishikawa – electric guitars
 Seiji Kameda – bass guitars
 Nobuhiko Nakayama – programming
 Yuta Saito – synthesizer, harps

"Benkai Debussy"
 Ringo Sheena – vocals
 Seiji Kameda – bass guitars
 Masayuki Muraishi – drums
 Nobuhiko Nakayama – programming
 Makoto Totani (from Thinners) – guitars (uwamono)
 Makoto Minagawa (from Thinners) – synthesizer, chorus (uwamono)

"Gibs"
 Ringo Sheena – vocals
 Susumu Nishikawa – electric guitars
 Seiji Kameda – bass guitars
 Noriyasu Kawamura – drums, tambourines
 Nobuhiko Nakayama & Hiroshi Kitashiro – programming

"Yami ni furu ame"
 Ringo Sheena – vocals
 Susumu Nishikawa – electric guitars
 Seiji Kameda – bass guitars
 Noriyasu Kawamura – drums, tambourines
 Nobuhiko Nakayama – programming
 Ittetsu Gen Strings – string section

"Identity"
 Ringo Sheena – vocals, electric guitars
 Susumu Nishikawa – electric guitars
 Seiji Kameda – bass guitars
 Masayuki Muraishi – drums
 Makoto Minagawa – tambourines
 moOog yamamOTO (from Buffalo Daughter) – turntables

"Tsumi to Batsu"
 Ringo Sheena – vocals
 Kenichi Asai, Benzie (from Blankey Jet City) – electric guitars, tooth flute
 Seiji Kameda – bass guitars
 Masayuki Muraishi – drums
 Yuta Saito – organ

"Stoicism"
 Ringo Sheena – vocals, electric guitars
 Rino Tokitsu – the sample of voice
 Nobuhiko Nakayama – programming
 Susumu Nishikawa – electric guitars

"Tsuki ni Makeinu"
 Ringo Sheena – vocals
 Yukio Nagoshi – electric guitars, acoustic guitars
 Seiji Kameda – bass guitars
 Koichi Asakura, Asa-Chang (from Asa-Chang & Junray) – drums

"Sakana"
 Ringo Sheena – vocals
 Susumu Nishikawa – electric guitars
 Seiji Kameda – bass guitars
 Noriyasu Kawamura – drums, tambourines
 Nobuhiko Nakayama – programming
 Yuta Saito – electric piano
 Yokan Mizue – trumpet

"Byoushou Public"
 Ringo Sheena – vocals, electric guitars
 Susumu Nishikawa – electric guitars
 Seiji Kameda – bass guitars
 Masayuki Muraishi – drums
 Toshiyuki Mori – organ

"Honnou"
 Ringo Sheena – vocals
 Yukio Nagoshi – electric guitars, acoustic guitars
 Seiji Kameda – bass guitars
 Yuta Saito – piano
 Masayuki Muraishi – drums
 Nobuhiko Nakayama – programming

"Izon-shō"
 Ringo Sheena – vocals
 Susumu Nishikawa – electric guitars
 Seiji Kameda – bass guitars
 Noriyasu Kawamura – drums, tambourines
Toshiyuki Mori – piano
 moOog yamamOTO (from Buffalo Daughter) – turntables
 Nobuhiko Nakayama – programming

Notes

Ringo Sheena albums
2000 albums
Albums produced by Seiji Kameda